The Romani people official football team is a national football team representing the Romani people.

Affiliation 
It is not affiliated to any FIFA confederation, so it cannot play in any of their tournaments. It is, however, affiliated to ConIFA, and play in the ConIFA European Football Cup.

History 
They played in the 2015 edition, where they finished 5th out of 6, above the hosts Székely Land. They showed good form and skill, and they narrowly lost to Ellan Vannin and Padania. Since January 2016 the third football team of Milan – Brera Calcio – ,whose chairman is Alessandro Aleotti, is managing the Romani People national team as a tool to fight the ongoing discrimination of the Romani People across Europe.

Brera Calcio is launching a new project which aims to use football as a way for changing the perception and growing the awareness of Romani People. The football club is working in collaboration with the international activist Dijana Pavlovic, a Romani actress with a Serbian passport living in Milan. Staff at Brera Calcio is selecting the players from this certain ethnicity in 18 European countries, who will proudly wear the T-shirts of “National” being the largest ethnic minority in Europe. The team is coached by Brera Calcio coach Andrea Mazza and they will compete at the 2016 ConIFA World Football Cup

International matches

References

CONIFA member associations
European national and official selection-teams not affiliated to FIFA